Brunsbach may refer to:
Brunsbach (Sülz), a river of North Rhine-Westphalia, Germany, tributary of the Sülz
Brunsbach (Wupper), a river of North Rhine-Westphalia, Germany, tributary of the Wupper